Robert Eugene Jeangerard (June 20, 1933 – July 5, 2014) was an American basketball player who competed in the 1956 Summer Olympics.  Born in Evanston, Illinois, Jeangerard played collegiately at the University of Colorado. He then played for the Phillips 66ers in the NIBL (National Industrial Basketball League).  The Phillips 66ers won the Olympic Trials in 1956, and Jeangerard was one of five players from the Phillips 66ers selected for the 1956 Olympic team, along with their coach, Gerald Tucker. Bill Russell and K.C.Jones, two-time NCAA Champions from the University of San Francisco, were also on the 1956 Olympic team, which won the gold medal.

Jeangerard also served in the U.S. Air Force, started his own chain of tire stores, became a lawyer for his stores, and started the Jeangerard Foundation which raised money for national parks.

A long-time resident of San Carlos, California, Jeangerard died on July 5, 2014 after a long battle with Alzheimer's disease.

References

External links
Olympic profile
basketpedya.com

1933 births
2014 deaths
American men's basketball players
Basketball players from Illinois
Basketball players at the 1956 Summer Olympics
Basketball players at the 1959 Pan American Games
Colorado Buffaloes men's basketball players
Medalists at the 1956 Summer Olympics
Olympic gold medalists for the United States in basketball
Pan American Games gold medalists for the United States
Pan American Games medalists in basketball
People from San Carlos, California
Phillips 66ers players
Sportspeople from Evanston, Illinois
Sportspeople from the San Francisco Bay Area
United States men's national basketball team players
Forwards (basketball)
Medalists at the 1959 Pan American Games
New Trier High School alumni
1959 FIBA World Championship players